We Three is an album by American jazz drummer Roy Haynes, with pianist Phineas Newborn and bassist Paul Chambers, recorded in 1958 and released on the New Jazz label in May 1959.

Reception

AllMusic stated: "This trio had a brief recording career together, but as this solid set shows, they made the best of it."

Track listing
 "Reflection" (Ray Bryant) - 4:24
 "Sugar Ray" (Phineas Newborn, Jr.) - 6:25
 "Solitaire" (King Guion, Carl Nutter, Renee Borek) - 8:54
 "After Hours" (Avery Parrish) - 11:21
 "Sneakin' Around" (Bryant) - 4:24
 "Our Delight" (Tadd Dameron) - 4:01

Personnel 
Roy Haynes - drums
Phineas Newborn Jr. - piano
Paul Chambers - bass

References 

1959 albums
Roy Haynes albums
Paul Chambers albums
New Jazz Records albums
Albums produced by Esmond Edwards
Albums recorded at Van Gelder Studio